The 1971–72 Israel State Cup (Gvia HaMedina) was the 33rd season of Israel's nationwide football cup competition and the 18th after the Israeli Declaration of Independence.

The competition was won by Hapoel Tel Aviv, who have beaten Hapoel Jerusalem 1–0 at the final.

Results

Fourth round

Fifth round

Sixth Round

Round of 16

Quarter-finals

Semi-finals

Final

References
100 Years of Football 1906-2006, Elisha Shohat (Israel), 2006, pp. 226-227
Cup (Pages 4-5) Hadshot HaSport, 16.1.1972, archive.football.co.il 
Colchester from Herzliya Maariv, 25.1.1972, Historical Jewish Press 
Cup (Page 4) Hadshot HaSport, 26.1.1972, archive.football.co.il 
Cup (Page 3) Hadshot HaSport, 27.1.1972, archive.football.co.il 
Cup (Pages 4-5) Hadshot HaSport, 20.2.1972, archive.football.co.il 
Cup (Pages 2-4) Hadshot HaSport, 19.4.1972, archive.football.co.il 

Israel State Cup
State Cup
Israel State Cup seasons